The 2013 Brasil Tennis Cup is a women's tennis tournament played on outdoor hard courts. It was the 1st edition of the Brasil Tennis Cup since 2002, and is on the International category of the 2013 WTA Tour. It took place in Florianópolis, Brazil, from February 24 through March 3, 2013.

Singles main-draw entrants

Seeds 

 Rankings are as of February 18, 2013.

Other entrants 
The following players received wildcards into the singles main draw:
  Maria Fernanda Alves
  Paula Cristina Gonçalves
  Beatriz Haddad Maia

The following players received entry from the qualifying draw:
  Kristina Barrois
  Beatriz García Vidagany  
  Hsu Chieh-yu
  María Irigoyen
  Tereza Mrdeža 
  Adriana Pérez

Withdrawals 
Before the tournament
  Petra Cetkovská
  Camila Giorgi (shoulder injury)
  Laura Robson
  Stefanie Vögele
  Galina Voskoboeva

Doubles main-draw entrants

Seeds 

 Rankings are as of February 18, 2013.

Other entrants 
The following pair received a wildcard into the doubles main draw:
  Carla Forte /  Beatriz Haddad Maia

Champions

Singles 

 Monica Niculescu def.  Olga Puchkova, 6–2, 4–6, 6–4

Doubles 

 Anabel Medina Garrigues /  Yaroslava Shvedova def.  Anne Keothavong /  Valeria Savinykh, 6–0, 6–4

References

External links 
 

Brasil Tennis Cup
Brasil Tennis Cup
Bra